Rev-elation is a jazz album by vibraphonist Joe Locke that was released in 2005. The album was recorded at Ronnie Scott's Jazz Club in London, England, and reached the No. 1 position on the JazzWeek chart in November 2005.

Track listing

 "The Prophet Speaks" (Milt Jackson)
 "Young and Foolish" (Albert Hague/Arnold B. Horwitt)
 "The Look of Love" (Burt Bacharach/Hal David)
 "Rev-elation" (Mike LeDonne)
 "Opus de Funk" (Horace Silver)
 "Close Enough for Love" (Johnny Mandel)
 "Big Town" (Joe Locke)
 "Used to Be Jackson" (Brown)

Personnel
 Joe Locke – vibes
 Mike LeDonne – piano, Fender Rhodes
 Bob Cranshaw – bass
 Mickey Roker – drums

References

External links
 Joe Locke's website

2005 live albums
Live jazz albums